Styling Hollywood is a 2019 documentarian non-scripted fashion reality television series on Netflix created by Carlos King and starring celebrity stylist Jason Bolden and his husband, interior designer Adair Curtis through their JSN Studio.

The full season of Styling Hollywood was released on August 30, 2019.

Cast
 Jason Bolden
 Adair Curtis

Release
Styling Hollywood was released on August 30, 2019, on Netflix streaming.

Episodes

References

External links

2019 American television series debuts
Netflix original documentary television series